Route 52 may refer to:

Route 52 (WMATA), a bus route in Washington, D.C.
London Buses route 52

See also
List of highways numbered 52

52